Elections to Dundee City Council were held on 4 May 2017 on the same day as the other Scottish local government elections. The election used the eight wards created as a result of the Local Governance (Scotland) Act 2004, with each ward electing three or four Councillors using the single transferable vote system (a form of proportional representation). A total of 29 Councillors were elected.

After the 2012 election a Scottish National Party (SNP) majority administration of 16 was formed. In 2017 the SNP lost 2 seats reducing their numbers to 14, being one seat short of an overall majority. They formed an administration with the support of the Independent Ian Borthwick.

Background

Composition 
Throughout the term of the previous council, there was minimal change in the composition of members. In January 2016, Craig Melville, who was an SNP councillor for Maryfield was suspended from the party, thereby taking the number of councillors the SNP had to 15. Melville later resigned as a councillor and a by-election took place which was won back by the SNP thus resulting in the SNP returning back to 16 seats for the remainder of the term.

Retiring councillors 
Ahead of the election, seven councillors announced their retirement and would not stand for re-election, that included Bob Duncan who was Lord Provost and the council leader, Ken Guild.

Results

Overall 

Note: "Votes" are the first preference votes. The net gain/loss and percentage changes relate to the result of the previous Scottish local elections on 3 May 2012. This may differ from other published sources showing gain/loss relative to seats held at dissolution of Scotland's councils.

Votes summary

Ward summary 

|- class="unsortable" align="centre"
!rowspan=2 align="left"|Ward
! % 
!Seats
! %
!Seats
! %
!Seats
! %
!Seats
! %
!Seats
! %
!Seats
!rowspan=2|Total
|- class="unsortable" align="center"
!colspan=2 |SNP
!colspan=2 |Lab
!colspan=2 |Conservative
!colspan=2 |Lib Dems
!colspan=2 |Independent
!colspan=2 |Others
|-
|align="left"|Strathmartine
|bgcolor="#efe146"|43.2%
|bgcolor="#efe146"|2
|18.9%
|1
|9.0%
|0
|13.6%
|0
|13.5%
|1
|1.7%
|0
|4
|-
|align="left"|Lochee
|bgcolor="#efe146"|42.7%
|bgcolor="#efe146"|2
|29.3%
|2
|12.1%
|0
|2.1%
|0
|9.7%
|0
|4.1%
|0
|4
|-
|align="left"|West End
|28.6%
|1
|11.6%
|1
|11.8%
|1
|bgcolor="#FAA61A"|38.5%
|bgcolor="#FAA61A"|1
|2.4%
|0
|9.6%
|0
|4
|-
|align="left"|Coldside
|bgcolor="#efe146"|44.2%
|bgcolor="#efe146"|2
|27.9%
|2
|11.0%
|0
|2.8%
|0
|8.6%
|0
|5.6%
|0
|4
|-
|align="left"|Maryfield
|bgcolor="#efe146"|49.4%
|bgcolor="#efe146"|2
|21.6%
|1
|17.6%
|0
|5.3%
|0
|
|
|6.1%
|0
|3
|-
|align="left"|North East
|bgcolor="#efe146"|53.7%
|bgcolor="#efe146"|2
|27.0%
|1
|9.1%
|0
|1.3%
|0
|5.8%
|0
|3.0%
|0
|3
|-
|align="left"|East End
|bgcolor="#efe146"|53.3%
|bgcolor="#efe146"|2
|21.7%
|1
|12.9%
|0
|2.5%
|0
|4.6%
|0
|5.0%
|0
|3
|-
|align="left"|The Ferry
|29.9%
|1
|11.7%
|0
|bgcolor="#0087DC"|38.9%
|bgcolor="#0087DC"|2
|15.8%
|1
|
|
|3.6%
|0
|4
|- class="unsortable" class="sortbottom"
!align="left"| Total
|bgcolor="#efe146"|42.7%
|bgcolor="#efe146"|14
!21.0%
!9
!17.9%
!3
!8.4%
!2
!5.5%
!1
!4.6%
!0
!29
|}

Ward results

Strathmartine
2012: 2xSNP; 1xLab; 1xIndependent
2017: 2xSNP; 1xLab; 1xIndependent
2012-2017 Change: No Change

Lochee
2012: 2xSNP; 1xLab; 1x independent 
2017: 2xSNP; 2xLab
2012-2017: Labour Gain from independent

West End
2012: 2xSNP; 1xLib Dem; 1xLab
2017: 1xLib Dem; 1xSNP; 1xCon; 1xLab
2012-2017: Conservative gain one seat from SNP

Coldside
2012: 2xSNP; 2xLab
2017: 2xSNP; 2xLab
2012-2017: No Change

Maryfield
2012: 2xSNP; 1xLab
2017: 2xSNP; 1xLab
2012-2017: No change

North East
2012: 2xSNP; 1xLab
2017: 2xSNP; 1xLab
2012-2017: No Change

East End
2012: 2xSNP; 1xLab
2017: 2xSNP; 1xLab
2012-2017: No Change

The Ferry
2012: 2xSNP; 1xCon; 1xLab
2017: 2xCon; 1xLib Dem; 1xSNP
2012-2017: Conservative & Lib Dem each gain one seat from Labour & SNP.

 = Outgoing Councillor from a different ward.

Changes since 2017
† In February 2019, North East Labour Cllr. Brian Gordon died after a short illness. A by-election took place on 2 May 2019 which was won by Steven Rome of the SNP.
On 15 May 2019, North East SNP Cllr. Gregor Murray resigned from the party, accusing the party of being institutionally transphobic. Cllr. Murray continues to serve the ward as an Independent.
On 11 May 2021, Lochee SNP Cllr Alan Ross resigned from the party and became an Independent. On 4 February 2022, he joined the Alba Party, becoming the first Alba councillor in Dundee.

By-elections since 2017

Notes

References

External links
Dundee City Council website

21st century in Dundee
2017
2017 Scottish local elections